Michael Boroš (born 9 August 1992) is a Czech cyclo-cross and road cyclist. He represented his nation in the men's elite event at the 2016 UCI Cyclo-cross World Championships  in Heusden-Zolder.

Major results

Cyclo-cross

2012–2013
 1st Podbrezová
 2nd Ternitz
2013–2014
 Toi Toi Cup
1st Hlinsko
1st Slaný
 2nd National Championships
2014–2015
 1st Stadl-Paura
 2nd Overall Toi Toi Cup
1st Milovice
1st Uničov
1st Loštice
 3rd National Championships
2015–2016
 2nd National Championships
2016–2017
 1st  National Championships
 EKZ CrossTour
3rd Baden
2017–2018
 1st  National Championships
2018–2019
 1st  National Championships
 3rd Iowa City Race 3
2019–2020
 1st Overall Toi Toi Cup
1st Holé Vrchy
1st Jabkenice
 2nd Munich
 2nd Vittorio Veneto
 3rd Fae' di Oderzo
2020–2021
 1st Overall Toi Toi Cup
1st Mladá Boleslav
1st Rýmařov
2021–2022
 1st  National Championships
 1st Overall Toi Toi Cup
1st Mladá Boleslav
1st Slaný
1st Rýmařov
1st Veselí nad Lužnicí
2nd Hlinsko
2022–2023
 1st  National Championships
 Toi Toi Cup
1st Holé Vrchy
1st Hlinsko

Road
2014
 7th Overall Course de la Paix U23
2019
 5th Road race, National Road Championships
2022
 National Road Championships
4th Road race
5th Time trial

References

External links

1992 births
Living people
Cyclo-cross cyclists
Czech male cyclists
Sportspeople from Prague